Khorajpur is a village located in the Ghaziabad district of Uttar Pradesh state in India.

Villages in Ghaziabad district, India